Scipione Tadolini (1822–1893) was an Italian sculptor operating in the second half of the 19th century.

Life

He was the son of sculptor Adamo Tadolino (1788-1868), one of Antonio Canova's main assistants. He was the brother of the sculptor Tito Tadolini (1828-1910), and in turn father of sculptor Giulio Tadolini (1849–1918). His works were in a romantic form of the Neo-classical tradition.

Tadolini was trained in his father's studio. His first major work was Ninfa Pescatrice (Nymph Fishing) in 1846. During his career, he created a statue of Santa Lucia for the Santa Lucia del Gonfalone Church in Rome, a bust of Victor Emmanuel II of Italy, an equestrian portrait of Simon Bolivar for Lima, Peru, and St Michael Overcoming Satan, commissioned by merchant Gardner Brewer and now in Boston College. His family's studio, at 150a-b Via del Babuino, Rome, has now been restored as the Museo Atelier Canova Tadolini, which preserves the works of Canova and the Tadolini family.

Selected works 

 Ninfa Pescatrice (Nymph Fishing), 1846
 Seated Female Fishing, 1858
 St Michael Overcoming Satan, Boston College, USA, 1865-9
 The Greek Slave, 1871
 Eve, in the Kibble Palace, Botanic Gardens, Glasgow, c. 1875
 Ceres and Bacchus, 1881
 Figure of an Odalesque, 1882
 King Vittorio Emanuele II in the Senate, Rome.

References 

 Glasgow Sculpture
 Web Gallery of Art
 Richard Redding Antiques
 Museo Atelier Canova Tadolini

19th-century Italian sculptors
Italian male sculptors
1822 births
1893 deaths
19th-century Italian male artists